"Keep Me Rockin'" is a song recorded by Canadian country music artist Patricia Conroy. It was released in 1996 as the fifth single from her third studio album, You Can't Resist. It peaked at number 3 on the RPM Country Tracks chart in March 1996.

Chart performance

Year-end charts

References

1994 songs
1996 singles
Patricia Conroy songs
Warner Music Group singles
Songs written by Jennifer Kimball
Songs written by Patricia Conroy